Chamcha (Çamça) is a rural locality (a selo) in Orto-Nakharinsky Rural Okrug of Lensky District in the Sakha Republic, Russia, located  from Lensk, the administrative center of the district, and  from Orto-Nakhara, the administrative center of the rural okrug. Its population as of the 2002 Census was 355.

References

Notes

Sources
Official website of the Sakha Republic. Registry of the Administrative-Territorial Divisions of the Sakha Republic. Lensky District. 

Rural localities in Lensky District, Sakha Republic